Mekapotula Somanath, (1937–1992) was a famous Indian Art director, who worked for Telugu (Tollywood) and Tamil (Kollywood) film industries. He worked for most of the films made by Tamil actor, Bhagyaraj and Telugu actor Chalam. He also worked for movies made by Telugu directors Mutyala Subbaiah and Relangi Narasimha Rao.

He worked as an Art Director for a Bollywood movie Aakhree Raasta, directed by Bhagyaraj.

Some of his works include-

Indian art directors
1937 births
1992 deaths